Frank Wattam (12 November 1908 – 1984) was an English professional footballer who played as a wing half.

References

1908 births
1984 deaths
Footballers from Grimsby
English footballers
Association football wing halves
Grimsby YMCA F.C. players
Grimsby Albion F.C. players
Cleethorpes Town F.C. players
Louth Town F.C. players
Grimsby Town F.C. players
English Football League players